Daloloia Group are islands of Papua New Guinea. They are in the Louisiade Archipelago. They Include Bonura Island and Sarupai Island. 
The islands have a total area of 0.13 km2

References

Archipelagoes of Papua New Guinea
Islands of Milne Bay Province
Louisiade Archipelago